Parnassius dongalaicus, the Tytler's Apollo, is a high-altitude butterfly which is found in China.

It is a member of the snow Apollo genus (Parnassius) of the swallowtail family (Papilionidae).

P. dongalaicus was originally described as a species, but was subsequently considered conspecific with Parnassius epaphus. Sorimachi (1995) and Sugisawa (1996) both regard P. dongalaicus as a good species sympatric with epaphus and as the senior synonym of rikihiroi Kawasaki, 1995.

References
Sorimachi, Y. 1995. The Primer of Parnassius. Sorimachi, Saitama; 181 pp. In Japanese but including 40 plates.
Sugisawa, S. 1996. Geographical and individual variations of the genus Parnassius Latreille, 1804 (9) Parnassius epaphus Oberthür & Parnassius dongalaicus Tytler. Illustrations of Selected Insects in the World. Series A (Lepidoptera), 9: 133-155.
Kawasaki, Y. (1995) Description of one new species and four new subspecies of the Genus Parnassius (Lepidoptera, Papilionidae) from collecting expeditions in Thibet, China 1994 [in Japanese], Wallace 1: 9-29; pls. 11, 13, 14 [partim].
Tytler, H. C. (1926) Tytler, H. C. (1926) Notes on some new and interesting butterflies from India and Burma, part I. The Journal of the Bombay Natural History Society 31 (1/2): 248-260; pls. 1 + 4.

dongalaicus
Butterflies described in 1926